Little Busby is a civil parish in the Hambleton District of North Yorkshire, England. It is near the North York Moors and Stokesley. It is pronounced little 'Buzz - Bee'. The population of the parish was estimated at 20 in 2013.

Busby Hall is a country house, possibly built after a fire of 1764. It is constructed from finely-coursed herringbone-tooled sandstone with a Lakeland slate roof in 2 storeys to an L-shaped floorplan and has a 5 bay frontage. The building is grade II* listed.

References

Civil parishes in North Yorkshire
Hambleton District